"How Can I Live" is a song by American alternative metal band Ill Niño. The song was released as the lead single from the band's second album Confession. The song originally appeared on the soundtrack for the slasher film Freddy vs. Jason as well as playing over the film's end credits.

Music video
The song's music video begins with a woman walking down a street, as the camera reveals the name of the street is Elm Street. The woman stops and looks around, with someone watching her from behind a fence. The woman tries to runaway a few times, with the unseen presence chasing her, before she falls to the ground. At the end of the video the woman wakes up in bed, revealing that it was just a nightmare. The video's story with the woman is intercut with shots of the band performing the song in a room.

Track listing

Chart positions

References

2003 songs
2003 singles
Ill Niño songs
Roadrunner Records singles
Friday the 13th (franchise) music
A Nightmare on Elm Street (franchise) music
Song recordings produced by Bob Marlette
Songs written by Cristian Machado